The Bishops in Foreign Countries Act 1841 (5 Vict., c. 6) is an Act of Parliament passed by the Parliament of the United Kingdom to enable the United Church of England and Ireland to create bishops overseas.

The Act authorised the consecration of a bishop for a foreign country who need not be a subject of the British crown nor take the oaths of allegiance or of supremacy, while, on the other hand, the clergy ordained by him would have no right to officiate in England or Ireland.

The need for the act arose after the English Church and government agreed to consent to the establishment of the Anglican-German Bishopric in Jerusalem.

The Act received royal assent on 5 October 1841 and remains, largely in force.

References

Bibliography
 (Google Books)
Meyer, P. (1914) "Jerusalem, Anglican-German Bishopric in", Schaff-Herzog Encyclopedia of Religious Knowledge

External links

United Kingdom Acts of Parliament 1841
Church of England legislation
Christianity and law in the 19th century
1841 in Christianity
Law about religion in the United Kingdom